Marvin Dawson Mathis (November 30, 1940 – April 17, 2017) was an American newsman and politician who served five terms as a U.S. Representative from Georgia from 1971 to 1981.

Biography 
Born in Nashville, Georgia, Mathis attended the Nashville public schools. He attended South Georgia College in Douglas, Georgia. From 1964 to 1970, he was news director of WALB-TV in Albany, Georgia.

Congress 
Mathis was elected as a Democrat to the Ninety-second and to the four succeeding Congresses (January 3, 1971 – January 3, 1981). He was an unsuccessful candidate for nomination to the United States Senate in 1980.

Later career 
In 1982 he tried to reclaim his old seat in the house but lost to successor  Charles Hatcher in the Democratic primary. 

He became a private sector lobbyist. 

He was a resident of Nashville, Georgia.

Death 
Mathis died in April 2017 in Tifton, Georgia, aged 76.

References

1940 births
2017 deaths
Democratic Party members of the United States House of Representatives from Georgia (U.S. state)
People from Berrien County, Georgia
South Georgia State College alumni
20th-century American politicians
Members of Congress who became lobbyists